The University of Lethbridge (also known as uLethbridge, uLeth, and U of L) is a public comprehensive and research higher education institution located in Lethbridge, Alberta, Canada, with a second campus in the city of Calgary, Alberta. It was founded in the liberal education tradition.

History 

The University of Lethbridge welcomed 650 students when it first opened its doors in 1967. With the completion of University Hall in 1971, the university moved permanently to west Lethbridge with enrolment growing to over 1,200 students. The current location of the university was chosen only after an intense community debate with the provincial government which wanted the university to be located in east Lethbridge. After the university's first convocation on May 18, 1968, more than 500 students, faculty and community members held a protest march in support of having the university located in west Lethbridge. Soon after, the government decided west Lethbridge would be the university's permanent location.

University Hall was designed by the renowned architect Arthur Erickson and sits within the coulees above the Oldman River. University Hall was selected as one of four buildings to appear on a Canadian postage stamp celebrating the 100th anniversary of the Royal Architectural Institute of Canada (RAIC).

Over the next half century, the student population has grown to 8,155 undergraduates and 640 graduate students as of 2019. The university now offers over 150 undergraduate degree programs in the Arts, Sciences, Management, Education, Health Sciences and Fine Arts. Further, the university has added over 50 Masters and PhD programs.

On February 10, 2022, the University of Lethbridge Faculty Association began its first ever legal strike action over issues such as working conditions, collegial governance, and equitable pay and benefits. The strike concluded on March 23, with the Faculty Association voting 91% in favour of a new collective agreement with the university lasting through June 2024.

Development 

Year 2000 to 2020

The university experienced tremendous growth in campus buildings during this period.

Library 
Also known as the LINC (Library Information Network Centre), was opened in 2001 after a 10-year fundraising campaign. It houses the library, numerous individual and group study spaces, and some of the best views on campus.

Canadian Centre for Behavioural Neuroscience (CCBN) 
The CCBN is home to Canada's first Department of Neuroscience, state-of-the-art labs, and has attracted world-class researchers, including: Dr. Bryan Kolb and Dr. Bruce McNaughton.

1st Choice Savings Centre for Sport & Wellness 
The 1st Choice Savings Centre has become a hub of activity on campus and includes the following facilities:

 A triple gymnasium (2 hardwood floors and 1 synthetic surface), with retractable seating for 2000 spectators; suitable for hosting major sporting events as well as conferences and speaking engagements;
 A 2,000 square foot main climbing wall;
 A new expanded fitness centre along with a four-lane 200 metre indoor running track;
 Multi-purpose  studios for yoga, dance and fitness classes allow for more fitness programming for all ages; and,
 Universal change rooms and expanded locker rooms with steam room.

Turcotte Hall 
Opened in 2008, Turcotte Hall is home to the Faculty of Education, Counselling Services and the campus Physical Plant.

Alberta Water and Environment Science Building 
The Alberta Water and Environment Science Building (AWESB) was completed in 2008 and contains numerous sustainable features that helped it earn silver LEED certification. The AWESB houses many of the country's most accomplished water researchers and is home to the Water Institute for Sustainable Environments.

Community Sports Stadium 

The $12-million facility was constructed through a partnership between the City of Lethbridge and the University of Lethbridge, with additional funding provided by the Government of Alberta. The Stadium includes:

 One artificial grass, regulation size combination soccer/rugby/football field with lights;
 One natural grass, regulation size soccer pitch;
 A 400-metre, eight lane synthetic outdoor track; and,
 Throwing areas, jumping pits and open spaces for various track and field events; grandstand stadium seating for 2000 spectator.

Markin Hall 

Named after Dr. Alan Markin in recognition of his generous financial support of the building, Markin Hall is home to the Dhillon School of Business and the Faculty of Health Sciences. The building includes the Centre for Financial Market Research and Teaching (“Trading Room”) which provides direct connections to global trading markets, giving students hands-on experience with equities trading and risk management. Also has the Simulation Health Centre, which has patient simulators for the Health Sciences 
students. Students can engage in clinical practice on life like mannequins which can simulate body functions in a realistic setting set up to imitate a hospital.

Science Commons 
The most recent development at the University of Lethbridge is the "Destination Project", the first phase of which was a new $280M  science and academic building, known as Science Commons. This facility, officially opened in September 2019, features laboratory and teaching facilities, as well as "outreach" and "maker" spaces. The Science Commons houses over 100 faculty researchers in physics, astronomy, chemistry, biochemistry, biological sciences, neuroscience, and psychology. In 2018, it was shortlisted for the World Architecture Festival

President 
The president of the University of Lethbridge, Mike Mahon, is in his second term and has led the institution since July 1, 2010. Mahon, who previously held the role of the dean of the Faculty of Physical Education and Recreation at the University of Alberta, is also the chair of the Board of Universities Canada.

Academics 
The University of Lethbridge offers both graduate and undergraduate degrees in four faculties and three schools, as described below.

The university is accredited under Alberta's Post-Secondary Learning Act and is considered a "comprehensive academic and research university" (CARU), which means offer a range of academic and professional programs that generally lead to undergraduate and graduate level credentials, and have a strong research focus.

Aboriginal student programs 
The University of Lethbridge provides special first-year bridging programs for Aboriginal students. The University of Lethbridge's Niitsitapi Teacher Education Program with Red Crow Community College was developed in partnership with specific Aboriginal communities to meet specific needs within Aboriginal communities.

Research 
The University of Lethbridge is a research-intensive university, named "Research University of the Year" in the undergraduate category in 2012, and consistently ranks highly in terms of TriCouncil funding, especially in the sciences, but increasingly in all fields of scholarly inquiry.  It is home to 60 research chairs, 8 Fellows of the Royal Society of Canada, and 2 Order of Canada recipients.

The university is home to 15 centres and institutes, which transcend traditional disciplinary boundaries, including the Alberta Gambling Research Institute (AGRI), Alberta RNA Research and Training Institute (ARRTI), Alberta Terrestrial Imaging Centre (ATIC), Canadian Centre for Behavioural Neuroscience (CCBN), Canadian Centre for Research in Advanced Fluorine Technologies (C-CRAFT), Centre for the Study of Scholarly Communication (CSSC), Centre for Culture and Community (CCC), Centre for Oral History and Tradition (COHT), Centre for Socially Responsible Marketing (CSRM), Health Services Quality Institute (HSQI), Institute for Child and Youth Studies (I-CYS), Institute for Space Imaging Science (ISIS), Prentice Institute for Global Population and Economy, Small Business Institute (SBI), and Water Institute for Sustainable Environments (WISE).

The university's infrastructure in the sciences and information technology is accessible to undergraduate students and the university is a provincial leader in terms of undergraduate involvement in publishable and translational faculty research and innovation.

Faculties and Schools 

The University of Lethbridge offers over 150 degree programs. It has seven faculties and schools that administer its bachelor's, master's, and doctoral degrees.

 Faculty of Arts and Science
 Faculty of Education
 Faculty of Fine Arts
 Faculty of Health Sciences
 Dhillon School of Business
 School of Graduate Studies
 School of Liberal Education

The Faculty of Arts and Science offers nine pre-professional programs in dentistry, journalism, law, medicine, nutrition and food sciences, optometry, social work, and veterinary medicine, as well as an engineering transfer program, through which students take their first year at the University of Lethbridge before completing their degrees at the University of Alberta or the University of Saskatchewan.

The Agility program in Innovation and Entrepreneurship was launched at the university in 2015. This program encourages transdisciplinary innovation, including social innovation, and will soon include a large makerspace in the new science and academic building to complement existing, specialized makerspaces. The university also partners with the Tecconnect centre for entrepreneurship and innovation (Economic Development Lethbridge), Regional Innovation Network of Southern Alberta (RINSA), and other organizations to encourage the production of spinoffs and collaboration with industry.

Rankings 

The University of Lethbridge was ranked 11th in Canada in the primarily undergraduate university category for Maclean's 2023 university rankings.

Athletics 
The university is represented in U Sports by the Lethbridge Pronghorns, formerly known as the Chinooks. They have men's and women's teams in basketball, judo, rugby union (women only), soccer, swimming, and track and field. The university formerly had men's and women's teams in volleyball (the men's team was cut in 1988, followed by the women in the early 1990s) and ice hockey (the men's and women's teams were simultaneously cut in April 2020), the latter of whom played off-campus at the Nicholas Sheran Ice Centre owned by the City of Lethbridge. The Pronghorns have won national championships in men's hockey (1994) and women's rugby (2007, 2008, 2009). The university has an intramurals program.

The home gymnasium for the Pronghorns is the 1st Choice Savings Centre for Sport & Wellness which includes three full-size basketball courts, an indoor track field, a rock-climbing wall, and an exercise room. The construction was finished in 2006 and is open to the public on a membership basis.

An outdoor stadium in the southern campus opened in fall 2009. It is the home of the Pronghorns soccer teams and the women's rugby team.

Art gallery 
The University of Lethbridge Art Gallery has one of the largest collections in Canada of 19th and 20th-century Canadian, American and European art, with over 13,000 pieces including drawing, print making, painting, photography, sculpture and installation.

The previous director, Jeffrey Spalding, spearheaded this nationally renowned art collection. Josephine Mills was appointed director/curator of the Art Gallery in 2001 and maintains a strong exhibition, publication, and research program.

The collection quickly outgrew available archiving and storage space, so a new building was completed in 1999 to house large works. Additional renovations were made in 2000 and 2003 to update a study area for the collection and an incoming/ outgoing art handling area.

In 2006, a comprehensive registration database was made available online of the University of Lethbridge collections.

Lineage and establishment

Arms

See also 
University of Lethbridge Students' Union
CKXU-FM
Lethbridge Pronghorns

References

External links 
 

 
Education in Lethbridge
Educational institutions established in 1967
Modernist architecture in Canada
Arthur Erickson buildings
Universities in Alberta
1967 establishments in Alberta
Tourist attractions in Lethbridge
Buildings and structures in Lethbridge